Technical Difficulties are unforeseen equipment problems such as hardware failures or software bugs that make it difficult or impossible to perform a desired action.

Technical Difficulties may also refer to:
Technical Difficulties (filk group)
Technical Difficulties (Racer X album)
Technical Difficulties (Training for Utopia album)
 The Technical Difficulties, a semi-educational, comedic and satirical podcast and video team made up of Tom Scott, Matt Gray, Gary Brannan, and Chris Joel.